Lengerich is a town in the district of Steinfurt, in North Rhine-Westphalia, Germany. It is situated on the southern slope of the Teutoburg Forest, approx. 15 km south-west of Osnabrück and 30 km north-east of Münster.

Transportation 

Lengerich is situated at the Wanne-Eickel-Hamburg railway and offers half-hourly connections to Münster and Osnabrück. 
The A1 autobahn also runs through Lengerich and the Lengerich/Tecklenburg exit is located to the west of the city.

Mayors
The mayor is the pharmacist Wilhelm Möhrke (independent), the predecessor was Friedrich Prigge.

International relations

Lengerich, Westphalia is twinned with:
  Leegebruch (Brandenburg, Germany)
  Wapakoneta (Ohio, United States)
  Warta (Poland)

Lengerich's neighboring municipalities, Ladbergen and Lienen, are sister cities in the United States with Wapakoneta's neighbors New Knoxville and Saint Marys, respectively.

Notable people

 Friedrich Kipp (1878–1953), writer
 Wolfgang Sidka (born 1954), football professional and coach
 Rudolf Smend (1851–1913), Theologian (Old Testament)
 Julius Smend (1857–1930), theologian
 Kai Strauss (born 1970), blues musician
 Wolfgang Streeck (born 1946), sociologist and director at the Max Planck Institute for Society Research in Cologne

References

External links
  

Steinfurt (district)